Stefanović is a Serbian surname meaning "son of Stefan" (Stephen). There are also variants of Stevanović and Stepanović. It may refer to:

 Aleksandar "Saša" Stefanović, Serbian-American professional basketball player
 Dejan Stefanović, Serbian footballer 
 Gavril Stefanović Venclović, Serbian writer
 Igor Stefanović, Serbian footballer
 Jani Stefanovic, musician
 Jesse Stefanovic, fictional character in Degrassi: The Next Generation
 Jovan Stefanović, Serbian footballer
 Karl Stefanovic, Australian television presenter
 Ljubiša Stefanović, Serbian-American professional basketball player
 Margita Stefanović, Serbian musician
 Milenko Stefanović, Serbian musician
 Peter Stefanovic, Australian television presenter
 Saša Stefanović, Serbian professional basketball player
 Sasha Stefanovic (born 1998), Serbian-American basketball player
 Vuk Stefanović Karadžić, Serbian linguist

See also
 

Surnames
Serbian surnames
Montenegrin surnames
Patronymic surnames
Surnames from given names